Yadukuha(formally Sahidnagar) was a Village Development Committee in Dhanusa District in the Janakpur Zone of south-eastern Nepal. At the time of the 2011 Nepal census, it had a population of 6,267 in 1,145 households. The major source of income for this village is agriculture (80%) & rest on local business. In past years, education was not given priorities, but villagers these days are sending their children to get education for their brighter future.

Mass collection of people on Sunday & Wednesday at local market for selling & buying vegetable products, fish, hand made bamboo products, and spices from around 15-20 nearby villages. Even small markets of vegetables are organized on Friday, Tuesday & Monday.

There is a myth that a god namely champawati resides in this village. In one summer night of 1970s many people saw a powerful light coming from a place and when people went to see that place they saw 3 goddess coming from underground earth. Everybody was scared and ran away. Still people claim that it was real. Now-a-days people say that when they go there in night they see the goddess there.

References

External links
UN map of the municipalities of Dhanusa District

Populated places in Dhanusha District